801 Helwerthia is a C-type asteroid orbiting in the Main belt near the Eunomia family. However, it is not a family member but an un-related interloper in the region because its composition is inconsistent with membership. Its diameter is about 33 km, its albedo around 0.038.

References

External links
 
 

000801
Discoveries by Max Wolf
Named minor planets
000801
19150320